James Anthony Molinaro (born April 27, 1981) is a retired American football offensive tackle in the National Football League (NFL). He was drafted by the Washington Redskins in the 2004 NFL Draft in the sixth round with the 180th overall pick. He played college football at the University of Notre Dame.

High school career
Molinaro was a USA Today "Honorable Mention All-American" during his high school football career at Bethlehem Catholic High School in Bethlehem, Pennsylvania.

1997 season
Molinaro was named a "First-team Associated Press Big School All-State" selection in 1997 and again in 1998, his junior and senior years. In 1997, he was one of five finalists for the "Pennsylvania Lineman of the Year Award", posting 46 tackles, 17 of them solo, 12.5 sacks, four tackles for losses, 15 forced passes and one batted pass.

1998 season
During his senior year at Bethlehem Catholic, in 1998, Molinaro recorded 18 solo tackles, 29 assists, 11.5 sacks, 8 forced passes, and 4 batted passes, helping lead Bethlehem Catholic to a 7-4 record. Molinaro was a three-year starter for Bethlehem Catholic, earning four letters in football as an offensive and defensive tackle.

College career
Molinaro was recruited out of Bethlehem Catholic by the University of Notre Dame. After redshirting his first season, Molinaro played as a reserve defensive tackle in 2000, during which he posted one solo tackle.

In 2001, Molinaro appeared in six games, seeing most of his action on special teams, but starting at right tackle in Notre Dame's game against the United States Naval Academy.  In 2002, Molinaro appeared in every game for the Fighting Irish and had two starts, mostly playing offensive lineman and appearing on special teams.  In 2003, Molinaro started every game for the Fighting Irish and graded out at 83.1 percent for blocking consistency, posting 104 knockdown blocks. He was named both an "All-Independent" and "Super Sleeper" selection by The NFL Draft Report following his senior year at Notre Dame.

NFL career

Washington Redskins
Molinaro entered the 2004 NFL Draft and was selected in the sixth round, with the 180th overall selection, by the Washington Redskins. With the Redskins, he appeared in 24 games in his first two NFL seasons (2004 and 2005).  In 2005, he helped lead the Redskins to their first NFL playoff appearance since 1999.

Dallas Cowboys
On March 21, 2008, he signed with the Dallas Cowboys.

Post-NFL career
Molinaro is active in real estate development in 2015 he was nominated “40 under 40” in the Piedmont Triad region of North Carolina.  Molinaro has been involved in various retail, industrial, and commercial developments in North Carolina, South Carolina, New Jersey, and Pennsylvania. He resides in Summerfield, North Carolina with his wife Erin (married in 2013) and son James Anthony Molinaro III (born in 2016).

External links
 Profile at NFL.com
 Profile at Yahoo! Sports
 Profile at ESPN.com

1981 births
Living people
American football offensive tackles
Bethlehem Catholic High School alumni
Dallas Cowboys players
Notre Dame Fighting Irish football players
Players of American football from Pennsylvania
Sportspeople from Northampton County, Pennsylvania
Sportspeople from Montgomery County, Pennsylvania
Washington Redskins players